WSOS-FM (94.1 MHz) is commercial radio station that broadcasts to the Jacksonville, Florida area.  The station is licensed in Fruit Cove to Chesapeake-Portsmouth Broadcasting Corporation. It is branded as Jax Classic Country 94.1 & 100.3 and broadcasts a classic country format exclusive on WSOS-FM.  WSOS-FM covers the southern parts of the Jacksonville metropolitan area. Studios are in the Southside district of Jacksonville, and the transmitter tower is in Fruit Cove.

History
WSOS-FM went on the air on 105.5 MHz as WMKM, licensed to St. Augustine, Florida. Its original construction permit was filed on August 10, 1981. WMKM changed callsigns on March 19, 1985 to WSOS, and on September 3, 2002, the station became WSOS-FM with the acquisition of WKLN (which took the WSOS callsign). By the time WSOS-FM was sold to Renda Broadcasting in 2005, it was running an adult contemporary format as "The Muuusic Station". Under Renda's ownership, the community of license was changed from St. Augustine to Fruit Cove, to better serve the Jacksonville market. The signal still originated in St. Augustine until March 9, 2011, when it switched formats from soft adult contemporary to classic rock. On April 5, 2016, WSOS-FM changed their format from a simulcast of contemporary Christian-formatted WMUV to a simulcast of talk-formatted WBOB. On May 23, 2018, WSOS-FM switched from the WBOB simulcast to a simulcast of classic country-formatted WYKB, branded as "Jax Country".
In January 2020, Jax Country became exclusive to WSOS-FM.

Previous logos

References

External links

SOS-FM
1991 establishments in Florida
Radio stations established in 1991
Classic country radio stations in the United States